Bader Al-Harthi (Arabic:بدر الحارثي) (born 2 April 1994) is an Emirati footballer.

External links

References

Emirati footballers
1994 births
Living people
Al Wahda FC players
Al Dhafra FC players
Dibba FC players
UAE Pro League players
Association football wingers